Margaret Hsing (1944-2009) was a Chinese actress from Hong Kong.

Early life 
On November 8, 1944, Hsing was born as Hsing Yung-hui in Shanghai, China.

Education 
Hsing graduated from New Method College in Hong Kong. Hsing learned dancing in Japan.

Career 
In 1962, at age 18, Hsing became a Shaw Brothers actress in Hong Kong. Hsing is known for her dancing abilities in her films. Hsing debuted in The Dancing Millionairess, a 1964 Mandarin Musical film directed by Doe Ching. Hsing also appeared as Chin Ching-Yu in The Sword and the Lute, a 1967 Martial Arts film directed by Hsu Tseng-Hung. Hsing's last film was Woman of the Night, a 1973 Adult drama film directed by Yu Kuan-Jen. Hsing is credited with over 25 films.

Filmography

Films 
This is a partial list of films.
 1964 The Dancing Millionairess - Chorus girl, Dancer 
 1964 The Last Woman of Shang - Dancing girl 
 1966 The Joy of Spring - Hsing Yong-Hui
 1967 The Sword and the Lute - Chin Ching-Yu 
 1968 The Enchanted Chamber - Chiang Wen-Tsui
 1970 The 5 Billion Dollar Legacy - Situ Pei-Fang 
 1972 The Bride from Hell - Anu / Feng Ai Jiao 
 1973 Woman of the Night - Su Xiao-Qi

Personal life 
In 1973, at age 29, Hsing immigrated to Los Angeles, California. Hsing developed mental illness. In 1994, after an argument, Hsing killed her mother with an axe. Hsing served 11 years in prison for manslaughter, and in 2007, she completed her prison sentence. In 2009, Hsing died.

References

External links 
 
 Margaret Hsing Hui at hkcinemagic.com
 Margaret Hsing Hui at filmaffinity.com
 The Shaws and Japan in Hong Kong Cinema: A Cross-cultural View By Law Kar, Frank Bren, Sam Ho

1944 births
2007 deaths
Criminals from Los Angeles
Hong Kong film actresses
People convicted of manslaughter
People from Los Angeles